Case Western Reserve University (CWRU) is a private research university in Cleveland, Ohio. Case Western Reserve was established in 1967, when Western Reserve University, founded in 1826 and named for its location in the Connecticut Western Reserve, and Case Institute of Technology, founded in 1880 through the endowment of Leonard Case Jr., formally federated.

Case Western Reserve University is a member of the Association of American Universities and is classified among "R1: Doctoral Universities – Very high research activity". According to the National Science Foundation, in 2019 the university had research and development (R&D) expenditures of $439 million, ranking it 20th among private institutions and 58th in the nation. The university has eight schools that offer more than 100 undergraduate programs and about 160 graduate and professional options.

Seventeen Nobel laureates have been affiliated with Case Western Reserve's faculty and alumni or one of its two predecessors. The famous Michelson–Morley experiment was conducted here in 1887, and Albert A. Michelson became the first American to win the Nobel Prize in a science.

Case Western Reserve University's main campus is approximately 5 miles (8 km) east of Downtown Cleveland in the neighborhood known as University Circle, an area containing many educational, medical, and cultural institutions. Case Western Reserve has a number of programs taught in conjunction with other University Circle institutions, including University Hospitals, the Cleveland Clinic, the Louis Stokes Cleveland Department of Veteran's Affairs Medical Center, Cleveland Institute of Music, the Cleveland Hearing & Speech Center, the Cleveland Museum of Art, the Cleveland Institute of Art, the Cleveland Museum of Natural History.  Severance Hall, home of the Cleveland Orchestra, is on the Case Western Reserve campus.

History

Western Reserve College (1826–1882) and University (1882–1967)

Western Reserve College, the college of the Connecticut Western Reserve, was founded in 1826 in Hudson, Ohio, as the Western Reserve College and Preparatory School. Western Reserve College, or "Reserve" as it was popularly called, was the first college in northern Ohio. The school was called "Yale of the West"; its campus, now that of the Western Reserve Academy, imitated that of Yale. It had the same motto, "Lux et Veritas" (Light and Truth), the same entrance standards, and almost the same curriculum.

The vision its founders had of Western Reserve College was that it would instill in students an "evangelical ethos", and produce ministers to remedy the acute shortage of them in Ohio. Liberal arts and sciences were important, but secondary. The college was located in Hudson because the town made the largest financial offer (to help in its construction).

The town of Hudson, about 30 miles southeast of Cleveland, was a quiet antislavery center from the beginning: its founder, David Hudson, was against slavery, and founding trustee Owen Brown was a noted abolitionist who secured the location for the college. The abolitionist John Brown, who would lead the 1859 raid on Harpers Ferry, grew up in Hudson and was the son of co-founder Owen Brown. Hudson was a major stop on the Underground Railroad.

Along with Presbyterian influences of its founding, the school's origins were strongly though briefly associated with the pre-Civil War abolitionist movement; the immediate abolition of slavery, instead of "colonizing" Africa with freed Blacks, was the dominant topic on campus in 1831, to the point that President Green complained nothing else was being discussed. The trustees were unhappy with the situation. The college's chaplain and sacred literature (Bible) professor, Beriah Green, gave four sermons on the topic, and then resigned, expecting that he would be fired. President Charles Backus Storrs took a leave of absence for health, and soon died. One of the two remaining professors, Elizur Wright, soon left to head the American Anti-Slavery Society. The center of American abolitionism, along with support from the well-to-do Tappan brothers, moved with Green to the Oneida Institute near Utica, New York, then, after a student walk-out, to Lane Seminary near Cincinnati, and finally, after a second mass student walkout, to Oberlin Collegiate Institute, later Oberlin College. "Oberlin's student body was the beneficiary of anti-abolitionist censure from other regional colleges, especially the Western Reserve College in nearby Hudson. Students flocked to Oberlin so that they could openly debate the antislavery issue without the threat of punishment or dismissal."

Western Reserve was the first college west of the Appalachian Mountains to enroll (1832) and graduate (1836) an African-American student, John Sykes Fayette. Frederick Douglass gave the commencement speech in 1854.

In 1838, the Loomis Observatory was built by astronomer Elias Loomis, and today remains the second oldest observatory in the United States, and the oldest still in its original location.

In 1852, the Medical School became the second medical? school in the United States to graduate a woman, Nancy Talbot Clark. Five more women graduated over the next four years, including Emily Blackwell and Marie Zakrzewska, giving Western Reserve the distinction of graduating six of the first eight female physicians in the United States.

By 1875, Cleveland had emerged as the dominant population and business center of the area, and the city wanted a prominent higher education institution. In 1882, with funding from Amasa Stone, Western Reserve College moved to Cleveland and changed its name to Adelbert College of Western Reserve University. Adelbert was the name of Stone's son.

Case School of Applied Science (1880–1947) and Institute of Technology (1947–1967)

In 1877, Leonard Case Jr. began laying the groundwork for the Case School of Applied Science by secretly donating valuable pieces of Cleveland real estate to a trust. He asked his confidential advisor, Henry Gilbert Abbey, to administer the trust and to keep it secret until after his death in 1880.

On March 29, 1880, articles of incorporation were filed for the founding of the Case School of Applied Science. Classes began on September 15, 1881. The school received its charter by the state of Ohio in 1882.

For the first four years of the school's existence, it was located in the Case family's home on Rockwell Street in downtown Cleveland. Classes were held in the family house, while the chemistry and physics laboratories were on the second floor of the barn. Amasa Stone's gift to relocate Western Reserve College to Cleveland also included a provision for the purchase of land in the University Circle area, adjacent to Western Reserve University, for the Case School of Applied Science. The school relocated to University Circle in 1885.

In 1921 Albert Einstein came to the Case campus during his first visit to the United States, out of respect of the physics work performed there. Besides noting the research done in the Michelson–Morley experiment, Einstein also met with Physics professor Dayton Miller to discuss his own research.

During World War II, Case School of Applied Science was one of 131 colleges and universities nationally that took part in the V-12 Navy College Training Program which offered students a path to a Navy commission.

Over time, the Case School of Applied Science expanded to encompass broader subjects, adopting the name Case Institute of Technology in 1947 to reflect the institution's growth.

Led by polymer expert Eric Baer in 1963, the nation's first stand-alone Polymer Science and Engineering program was founded, to eventually become the Department of Macromolecular Science and Engineering.

Federation of two universities

Although the trustees of Case Institute of Technology and Western Reserve University did not formally federate their institutions until 1967, the institutions already shared buildings and staff when necessary and worked together often. One such example was seen in 1887, when Case physicist Albert Michelson and Reserve chemist Edward Morley collaborated on the famous Michelson–Morley experiment.

There had been some discussion of a merger of the two institutions as early as 1890, but those talks dissolved quickly. In the 1920s, the Survey Commission on Higher Education in Cleveland took a strong stand in favor of federation and the community was behind the idea as well, but in the end all that came of the study was a decision by the two institutions to cooperate in founding Cleveland College, a special unit for part-time and adult students in downtown Cleveland.

By the 1960s, Reserve President John Schoff Millis and Case President T. Keith Glennan shared the idea that federation would create a complete university, one better able to attain national distinction. Financed by the Carnegie Corporation, Cleveland Foundation, Greater Cleveland Associated Foundation, and several local donors, a study commission of national leaders in higher education and public policy was charged with exploring the idea of federation. The Heald Commission, so known for its chair, former Ford Foundation President Henry T. Heald, issued its final report, "Vision of a University." The report predicted that a federation could create one of the largest private universities in the nation.

Case Western Reserve University (1967–present)
In 1967, Case Institute of Technology, a school with its emphasis on engineering and science, and Western Reserve University, a school with professional programs and liberal arts, came together to form Case Western Reserve University.

In 1968, the Department of Biomedical Engineering launched as a newly unified collaboration between the School of Engineering and School of Medicine as the first in the nation and as one of the first Biomedical Engineering programs in the world. The following year in 1969, the first Biomedical Engineering MD/PhD program in the world began at Case Western Reserve.

The first computer engineering degree program in the United States was established in 1971 at Case Western Reserve.

In 2003, the university unveiled a new logo and branding campaign that emphasized the "Case" portion of its name. In 2006, interim university president Gregory Eastwood convened a task group to study reactions to the campaign. The panel's report indicated that it had gone so poorly that, "There appear to be serious concerns now about the university's ability to recruit and maintain high-quality faculty, fund-raising and leadership." Also, the logo was derided among the university's community and alumni and throughout northeastern Ohio; critics said it looked like "...a fat man with a surfboard."

In 2007, the university's board of trustees approved a shift back to giving equal weight to "Case" and "Western Reserve." A new logo was chosen and implementation began July 1. In an open letter to the university community, interim president Eastwood admitted that "the university had misplaced its own history and traditions."
The "Forward Thinking" campaign was launched in 2011 by President Barbara Snyder to fundraise $1 billion, the largest in school history. The goal was reached in 2014 after 30 months. The board of trustees unanimously agreed to expand the campaign to $1.5 billion, which reached its mark a few years later in 2017. The campaign ultimately raised $1.82 billion.

The first 2020 United States presidential debate was held at the Samson Pavilion of the Health Education Campus (HEC), shared by the Cleveland Clinic.

In February 2020, president Barbara Snyder was appointed the president of Association of American Universities (AAU). Later that year, former Tulane University president Scott Cowen was appointed interim president. On October 29, 2020, Eric W. Kaler, former University of Minnesota president, was appointed as the new Case Western Reserve University president, effective July 1, 2021.

Presidents

Campus

The university is approximately 5 miles (8 km) east of downtown Cleveland. The campus comprises a large portion of University Circle, a park-like city neighborhood and commercial center, home to many educational, medical, and other cultural institutions, including the historic Wade Park District. Case Western Reserve has a number of programs taught in conjunction with neighboring institutions, including the Cleveland Institute of Music, the Cleveland Institute of Art, the Cleveland Hearing & Speech Center, the Cleveland Museum of Art, the Cleveland Museum of Natural History, the Western Reserve Historical Society, Cleveland Botanical Garden, and the Cleveland Play House.

Case Quad
The Case Quadrangle, known also to students as the Engineering Quad, is located south of Euclid Avenue between Adelbert Road and Martin Luther King Jr. Drive. Most engineering and science buildings are located on this quad, notably the John D. Rockefeller Physics Building. The Case Quad also houses administration buildings, including Adelbert Hall. The famous Michelson–Morley experiment occurred here, where a historical marker and the Michelson-Morley Memorial Fountain stand as commemoration. Other notable campus buildings include the Strosacker Auditorium and Nord Hall. The southernmost edge consists of athletic areas—Adelbert Gymnasium, Van Horn Field and the Veale Convocation, Recreation and Athletic Center (commonly referred to as the Veale Center). The Veale Center houses the Horsburgh Gymnasium and the Veale Natatorium.

Mather Quad

The Flora Stone Mather Quadrangle, known to students as the Mather Quad, is home to many humanities and social sciences subjects. The quad is located north of Euclid Avenue between East Blvd., East 115th Street, and Juniper Road. The Flora Stone Mather College Historic District is more strictly defined by the area between East Blvd, Bellflower Road, and Ford Road north of Euclid Avenue. Named for the philanthropist wife of prominent industrialist Samuel Mather and sister-in-law of the famous statesman John Hay, the Mather Quad is home to Weatherhead School of Management, School of Law, Mandel School of Applied Social Sciences, and many departments of the College of Arts and Sciences. The Kelvin Smith Library, Thwing Center, and Tinkham Veale Student Center (known also as "The Tink") sit on the western edge of the Mather Quad and are often considered the center of campus.

Transportation
On and near campus, CircleLink serves as the free public shuttle service for residents, employees and visitors in University Circle and Little Italy with routes running every 20–30 minutes during service hours. Colloquially, the shuttle buses are known as Greenies. To supplement evening and nighttime hours, the Safe Ride Program provides personal pickup of students and staff upon request.

For city public transit, rail and bus access are managed by the Greater Cleveland Regional Transit Authority (RTA). RTA passes of unlimited use are provided to undergraduate and full-time graduate students. The two Red Line rapid train stations are Little Italy–University Circle and Cedar–University. Notably, the Red Line connects campus to Cleveland Hopkins Airport and Downtown Cleveland. The bus rapid transit (BRT) HealthLine runs down the center of campus along Euclid Ave. Numerous RTA bus routes run through campus.

Case Western Reserve parking is managed by Standard Parking, and includes a network over 50 surface lots and 15 parking structures. Pay-by-phone parking is an available option for meters throughout campus.

Academics

Rankings

In U.S. News & World Reports 2021 rankings, Case Western Reserve was ranked as tied for 42nd among national universities and 155th among global universities. The 2020 edition of The Wall Street Journal/Times Higher Education (WSJ/THE) rankings ranked Case Western Reserve as 52nd among US colleges and universities.

In 2018, Case Western Reserve was ranked 37th in the category American "national universities" and 146th in the category "global universities" by U.S. News & World Report. In 2019 U.S. News ranked it tied for 42nd and 152nd, respectively. Case Western Reserve was also ranked 32nd among U.S. universities—and 29th among private institutions—in the inaugural 2016 edition of The Wall Street Journal/Times Higher Education (WSJ/THE) rankings, but ranked tied for 39th among U.S. universities in 2019.

Case Western Reserve is noted (among other fields) for research in electrochemistry and electrochemical engineering. The Michelson–Morley interferometer experiment was conducted in 1887 in the basement of a campus dormitory by Albert A. Michelson of Case School of Applied Science and Edward W. Morley of Western Reserve University. Michelson became the first American to win a Nobel Prize in science.

Also in 2018, "The Hollywood Reporter" ranked CWRU's Department of Theater Master of Fine Arts program with the Cleveland Play House as 18th in the English-speaking world. In 2019, this ranking improved to 12th.

In 2014, Washington Monthly ranked Case Western Reserve University as the 9th best National University, but in the 2018 rankings, Case Western Reserve was ranked the 118th best National University.

In 2013, Washington Monthly ranked Case Western Reserve as the nation's 4th best National University for contributing to the public good. The publication's ranking was based upon a combination of factors including social mobility, research, and service. In 2009, the school had ranked 15th. Although Washington Monthly no longer ranks contributions to the public good as such, in its 2018 rankings of National Universities Case Western Reserve was ranked 180th in Social mobility and 118th in Service.

In 2014, The Times ranked Case Western Reserve 116th worldwide, but in 2019 it ranked the university 132nd.

In 2013, Case Western Reserve was among the Top 25 LGBT-Friendly Colleges and Universities, according to Campus Pride, a national organization that aims to make universities safer and more inclusive for lesbian, gay, bisexual and transgender (LGBT) individuals. The recognition follows Case Western Reserve's first five-star ranking on the Campus Pride Index, a detailed survey of universities' policies, services and institutional support for LGBT individuals.

Case Western Reserve ranks 13th among private institutions (26th among all) in federal expenditures for science and engineering research and development, per the National Science Foundation.

Case Western Reserve is included in the college educational guide, Hidden Ivies, which discusses the college admissions process and attempts to evaluate 63 colleges in comparison to Ivy League colleges.

Undergraduate profile

The undergraduate student body hails from all 50 states and over 90 countries.

The six most popular majors are Biomedical Engineering, Biology/Biological Sciences, Nursing, Mechanical Engineering, and Psychology. Since 2016, the top fields for graduating CWRU undergraduate students have been engineering, nursing, research and science, accounting and financial services, and information technology.

Case Western Reserve has an acceptance rate of 27% for the class of 2026.

The class of 2023 had 82 percent of students from outside the state of Ohio and 16 percent from outside the United States. 70 percent graduated in the top 10 percent of their high school class. The mid-50% for SAT scores (25%–75%) were between 1360 and 1480. The mid-50% for ACT scores was 30 to 34 (superscored).

Schools and programs

The university in its present form consists of eight schools that offer more than 100 undergraduate programs and about 160 graduate and professional options.

 College of Arts and Sciences (1826)
 Case School of Dental Medicine (1892)
 Case School of Engineering (1880)
 School of Law (1892)
 Weatherhead School of Management (1952)
 School of Medicine
 'University Program' (1843)
 Cleveland Clinic Lerner College of Medicine ('College Program') (2002)
 Frances Payne Bolton School of Nursing (1898)
 Mandel School of Applied Social Sciences (1915)

CWRU also supports over a hundred 'Centers' in various fields.

Research

Case Western Reserve University is a member of the Association of American Universities and is classified among "R1: Doctoral Universities – Very high research activity". Following is a partial list of major contributions made by faculty, staff, and students at Case Western Reserve since 1887:

 Case Western Reserve was the site of the Michelson-Morley interferometer experiment, conducted in 1887 by Albert A. Michelson of Case Institute of Technology and Edward W. Morley of Western Reserve University. This experiment proved the non-existence of the ether, and provided evidence that later substantiated Einstein's special theory of relativity 
 Albert A. Michelson, who became the first American to win a Nobel Prize in science, taught at Case Institute of Technology. He won the prize in physics in 1907.
 Edward W. Morley, in 1895, made the most precise (to that date) determination of the atomic weight of oxygen, the basis for calculating the weights of all other elements.
 Dayton C. Miller, in 1896, performed the first full X-ray of the human body—on himself.
 George W. Crile, in 1905, performed the first modern blood transfusion, using a coupling device to connect blood vessels.
 Roger G. Perkins, in 1911, pioneered drinking water chlorination to eradicate typhoid bacilli.
 Henry J. Gerstenberger, in 1915, developed simulated infant formula.
 Claude S. Beck, in 1935, pioneered surgical treatment of coronary artery disease.
 Frederick S. Cross, in the 1950s, developed the first heart-lung machine used during open heart surgery.
 Claude S. Beck, in 1947, performed the first successful lifesaving defibrillation of the human heart and developed cardiopulmonary resuscitation (CPR).
 Robert Kearns, in 1964, invented the intermittent windshield wiper used in most modern automobiles.
 Frederick Reines, in 1965, first detected neutrinos created by cosmic ray collisions with the Earth's atmosphere and developed innovative particle detectors. Case Western Reserve had selected Prof. Reines as chair of the physics department based on Reines's work that first detected neutrinos emitted from a nuclear reactor—work for which Reines shared a 1995 Nobel Prize.
 Eric Baer, in 1967, pioneered the materials science of polymers and created the first comprehensive polymer science and engineering department at a major U.S. university.
 Joseph F. Fagan, in 1987, developed a test for infants to identify intellectual disability within one year of birth.
 In 1987 the first edition of the Encyclopedia of Cleveland History was published.
 Huntington F. Willard of the School of Medicine and University Hospitals of Cleveland—collaborating with colleagues at Athersys, Inc., in 1997—created the first artificial human chromosomes, opening the door to more detailed study of human genetics and potentially offering a new approach to gene therapy.
 Roger Quinn, in 2001, developed robots such as Whegs that mimic cockroaches and other crawling insects Case Biorobotics Lab
 Tshilidzi Marwala, in 2006, began work on Local Loop Unbundling in Africa. He also chaired the Local Loop Unbundling Committee on behalf of the South African Government. Furthermore, Marwala and his collaborators developed an artificial larynx, developed the theory of rational counterfactuals, computer bluffing as well as establishing the relationship between artificial intelligence and the theory of information asymmetry.
 In 2007, a team from Case Western Reserve participated in the DARPA Urban Challenge with a robotic car named DEXTER. Team Case placed as one of 36 semi-finalists. DEXTER was the only car in the race without any seating for humans, and the only one built from scratch as a robot car.
 Case Western Reserve University researchers are developing atomically thin drumheads which is tens of trillions times smaller in volume and 100,000 times thinner than the human eardrum. They will be made with the intent to receive and transmit signals across a radio frequency range which will be far greater than what we can hear with the human ear.
 Simon Ostrach and Yasuhiro Kamotani led spacelab projects entitled surface tension driven convection experiment (STDCE) aboard the Space Shuttle STS-50 and the re-flight STDCE-2 in USML-2 aboard STS-73 studying oscillatory thermocapillary flows in the absence of gravitational effects. 
 James T'ien has contributed to the study of numerous microgravity combustion space flight experiments including the Candle Flame In Non-Buoyant Atmospheres aboard the Space Shuttle STS-50 along with the reflight to Mir Orbiting Station in 1995, the Burning and Suppression of Solids (BASS)  taking place aboard the International Space Station along with the experiment reflight (BASS-2). He received the NASA Public Service Medal in 2000.  He is a member of the National Academy of Sciences and serves on the Committee of Biological and Physical Sciences in Space. .
 Salvatore Pais M.S., Ph.D., Engineer formerly with the Naval Research Laboratory, now working with the Air Force on hypersonic weapons program.

Today, the university operates several facilities off campus for scientific research. One example of this is the Warner and Swasey Observatory at Kitt Peak National Observatory in Arizona.

Electrochemistry
CWRU has contributed to the electrochemical sciences since the 1930's beginning with Prof. Frank Hovorka's studies of quinhydrone (quinone) and other electrodes. Subsequently, Prof. Ernest Yeager carried out pioneering studies on ultrasound electrodeposition and oxygen reduction reaction (ORR), which is directly relevant for H2-O2 fuel cells and batteries that use air electrodes such as zinc-air, iron-air, etc. The Yeager Center for Electrochemical Sciences (YCES), formerly the Case Center for Electrochemical Sciences, has provided annual workshops on electrochemical measurements since the late 1970's. The leadership in the Electrochemical Society have frequently included CWRU professors, and the university is home to six Fellows of the Electrochemical Society. Some notable achievements involve the work on ultrasound electrochemistry, oxygen reduction fundamentals, boron-doped diamond electrodes, in-situ electrochemical spectroscopy, polybenzimidazole (PBI) membranes for high-temperature fuel cells (HT-PEM), methanol fuel cells, iron flow batteries and electrochemical sensors. Noted laboratories at Case include the Electrochemical Engineering and Energy Laboratory (EEEL), the Electrochemical Materials Fabrication Laboratory (EMFL), the Case Electrochemical Capacitor Fabrication Facility and the ENERGY LAB.

Sears think[box]
Larry Sears and Sally Zlotnick Sears think[box] is a public-access design and innovation center at Case Western Reserve University that allows students and other users to access prototyping equipment and other invention resources. The makerspace is located in the Richey Mixon building, a seven-story, 50,000 sq. ft. facility behind the campus athletic center. Over $35 million has been invested in space including in large part from a funding of $10 million from alumni Larry Sears and his wife Sally Zlotnick Sears. Larry Sears is an adjunct faculty member in the Department of Electrical Engineering and Computer Science at CWRU and the founder of Hexagram, Inc. (now ACLARA Wireless Technologies).
Many projects and startup companies have come out of the makerspace.

Student life

The primary area for restaurants and shopping is the Uptown district along Euclid Ave adjacent to campus.  Cleveland's Little Italy is within walking distance. A campus shuttle runs to Coventry Village, a shopping district in neighboring Cleveland Heights.  Popular with students, Downtown Cleveland, Ohio City, Legacy Village, and Shaker Square are all a short driving distance or accessible by RTA.

Music

WRUW-FM (91.1 FM) is the campus radio station of Case Western Reserve University. Its motto, "More Music, Fewer Hits", can be seen adorning the rear bumpers of many vehicles in the area. WRUW broadcasts at a power of 15,000 watts and covers most of Northeast Ohio 24 hours a day, 365 days a year.

WRUW is staffed by Case Western Reserve students and community volunteers. The station's format can be classified as non-commercial "variety."

Case Western Reserve is also home to 19 performing ensembles, including a cappella groups such as Dhamakapella, the Case Men's Glee Club, Case Women's Glee Club, Case in Point, and Solstice. Other ensembles include the Case/University Circle Symphony Orchestra, Camerata Chamber Orchestra, Case/CIM Baroque Orchestra, Concert Choir, Early Music Singers, Jazz Ensemble 1 and 2, Marching Spartans, Percussion Ensemble, Symphonic Winds, University Singers, Collegium Musicum, New Music Ensemble, Wind Ensemble, and Chamber Music.

Case Western Reserve's main music venue is the Maltz Performing Arts Center.  Case Western Reserve also has two main rehearsal spaces for performing arts music majors and school ensembles. Haydn Hall contains practice rooms with Steinway pianos, along with the department offices. Denison Hall serves as a rehearsal, practice, and teaching space for the music students and school ensembles, and is attached to Wade Commons. The Cleveland Youth Wind Symphony also rehearses in Denison Hall. Music majors may take lessons and courses at the Cleveland Institute of Music.

For performances, all students, ensembles, and a cappella groups use Harkness Chapel. The bands and orchestra also perform at Severance Hall (the on-campus home of the Cleveland Orchestra) and CIM's Kulas Hall.

Computing
Case Western Reserve had the first ABET-accredited program in computer engineering.

In 1968, the university formed a private company, Chi Corporation, to provide computer time to both it and other customers. Initially this was on a Univac 1108 (replacing the preceding UNIVAC 1107), 36 bit, one's complement machine. The company was sold in 1977 to Robert G. Benson in Beachwood, Ohio becoming Ecocenters Corporation.

Project Logos, under ARPA contract, was begun within the department on a DEC System-10 (later converted to TENEX (BBN) in conjunction with connection to the ARPANET) to develop a computer-aided computer design system. This system consisted in a distributed, networked, graphics environment, a control and data flow designer and logic (both hardware and software) analyzer. An Imlac PDS-1 with lightpen interrupt was the main design workstation in 1973, communicating with the PDP-10 over a display communications protocol written by Don Huff as a Master Thesis and implemented on the Imlac by Ted Brenneman. Graphics and animation became another departmental focus with the acquisition of an Evans & Sutherland LDS-1 (Line Drawing System-1), which was hosted by the DEC System-10, and later with the acquisition of the stand-alone LDS-2.

Case Western Reserve was one of the earliest universities connected to the ARPANET, predecessor to the Internet. ARPANET went online in 1969; Case Western Reserve was connected in January, 1971. Case Western Reserve graduate Ken Biba published the Biba Integrity Model in 1977 and served on the ARPA Working Group that developed the Transmission Control Protocol (TCP) used on the Internet.

Case Western Reserve pioneered the early Free-net computer systems, creating the first Free-net, The Cleveland Free-Net, as well as writing the software that drove a majority of those systems, known as FreePort. The Cleveland Free-Net was shut down in late 1999, as it had become obsolete.

It was the first university to have an all-fiber-optic network, in 1989.

At the inaugural meeting in October, 1996, Case Western Reserve was one of the 34 charter university members of Internet2.

The university was ranked No. 1 in Yahoo Internet Life's 1999 Most Wired College list. There was a perception that this award was obtained through partially false or inaccurate information submitted for the survey, and the university did not appear at all on the 2000 Most Wired College list (which included 100 institutions). The numbers reported were much lower than those submitted by Ray Neff in 1999. The university had previously placed No. 13 in the 1997 poll.

In August 2003, Case Western Reserve joined the Internet Streaming Media Alliance, then one of only two university members.

In September 2003, Case Western Reserve opened 1,230 public wireless access points on the Case Western Reserve campus and University Circle.

Case Western Reserve was one of the founding members of OneCleveland, formed in October 2003. OneCleveland is an "ultra broadband" (gigabit speed) fiber optic network. This network is for the use of organizations in education, research, government, healthcare, arts, culture, and the nonprofit sector in Greater Cleveland.

Case Western Reserve's Virtual Worlds gaming computer lab opened in 2005. The lab has a large network of Alienware PCs equipped with game development software such as the Torque Game Engine and Maya 3D modeling software. Additionally, it contains a number of specialized advanced computing rooms including a medical simulation room, a MIDI instrument music room, a 3D projection "immersion room," a virtual reality research room, and console room, which features video game systems such as Xbox 360, PlayStation 3, and Wii. This laboratory can be used by any student in the Electrical Engineering and computer science department, and is heavily used for the Game Development (EECS 290) course.

Case Western's Internet Technology Service also runs a High Performance Computing Cluster (HPCC) utilizing 2684 processors over 200 computer nodes interconnected with gigabit fiberoptic ethernet. The HPCC is available for research utilizing a wide array of commercial and custom scientific software packages and computer languages including: Matlab, Mathematica, Ansys CFX Fluent and ICEM, Schrödinger, LAMMPS, Gaussian, NEURON, MCell, Python, Qhull, Sundials, Charmm/qchem, Rosetta, Gromacs, NAMD, C, C++, Fortran.

Housing
Residence halls are divided into two areas: one featuring suite-style rooms for second-year students in the South Residential Village, the other featuring double, single and suite style rooms for first-year students and upperclassmen in the North Residential Village. Both have Gigabit Ethernet network access and the wired network is one of the fastest that exists. A wireless campus network is also available in all buildings on campus and ranked as one of the fastest by Intel in 2005. Suite style housing, known as the Village at 115th, was opened in fall 2005 for upperclassmen and features one- to nine-person, "apartment-style" residence halls that come with air conditioning, a full kitchen area, and full-sized beds.

Residence Life at Case Western Reserve has a recent history of being liberal in its policies, including allowing co-ed suites (an option offered to non-freshman students, when requested and agreed upon by all occupants of a suite) and several co-ed floors for freshmen, as well as a three-day guest policy. Pets are allowed except for dogs, cats, ferrets, and a few other small mammals, but requests are granted discussion.

First-year students are grouped into one of four residential colleges that are overseen by first-year coordinators. The Mistletoe, Juniper, and Magnolia residential colleges were established when the "First Year Experience" system was introduced, and Cedar was created in the fall of 2005 to accommodate a large influx of new students. In the fall of 2007, Magnolia was integrated into Mistletoe, however, it was later re-separated in the fall of 2012. The areas of focus for each college are – Cedar: visual and performing arts; Mistletoe: service leadership; Juniper: multiculturalism and Magnolia: sustainability. Magnolia now includes Clarke Tower, which also houses second year students as well as first year students.

The residential colleges plan events together and are run by college councils that take student input and use it to plan social and community service-oriented activities.

3rd year students who are allowed to live off campus through graduate students have several university owned, university controlled, and independent apartment options.

North Residential Village
Situated on the northeast end of campus, the North Residential Village (NRV) is home to all Case Western Reserve's first-year students and many second-year students residing on campus. Constructed in the 1960s, the NRV consists of 12 4-floor buildings, an 11-floor building, Leutner (a dining hall), and a building containing the NRV area office and rehearsal space for Case Western Reserve's music department.

Triangle Towers
Triangle Towers are buildings located within Uptown that house both current students and staff and are also available for rent to the public. There are two towers, Tower 1 and Tower 2. Both overlook Uptown shops like Michell's Ice Cream and ABC Tavern.

The Village at 115
Located between East 115th Street and East 118th Street, the Village at 115 opened in the fall of 2005 for upper-class students. The Village consists of seven houses that surround DiSanto Field and the Bill Sudeck Track. Village housing is apartment style, with apartments that house one to nine people (excluding eight person units). The apartments are fully furnished. The Village is also LEED Gold certified. Houses 1–4 & 6–7 are certified silver while house 5 is certified gold.

Stephanie Tubbs Jones Residence Hall
The Stephanie Tubbs Jones Residence Hall is located the north side of campus along East 115th Street before Wade Park Avenue. The hall is for upperclassman and is LEED Gold certified. As of 2019, the building is the newest residential hall on campus and consists of five floors along with 106 apartments. In addition to the apartments, the building also contains eight townhouse-like residential units.

South Residential Village
Located between Murray Hill, Cedar, Edgehill, and Overlook roads, the South Residential Village (SRV) is home to most of Case Western Reserve's sophomore class. SRV is divided into two sections: Murray Hill Complex and Carlton Road Complex (known to students as bottom of the hill and top of the hill, respectively, due to the hill separating the two complexes). Carlton Road Complex includes three sophomore-only dormitories and several Greek life houses. Murray Hill Complex includes four sophomore only buildings and Fribley, the SRV dining hall. It also includes five Greek houses.

Greek life
Nearly one-half of the campus undergraduates are in a fraternity or sorority. There are ten sororities and sixteen fraternities currently on campus. Greek organizations are governed by an Interfraternity Council and Panhellenic Council. During the 2010–2011 school year, fraternities and sororities at Case collectively raised over $45,375 for philanthropy. In September 2010, the Delta Chi fraternity joined the Greek community, achieving chapter status in October 2012. In September 2012, Pi Beta Phi sorority began a colonization effort. In the Spring of 2013, Delta Sigma Phi fraternity began colonization efforts as well. In the Spring of 2014, a colony of Pi Kappa Phi was opened. In the 2014–2015 academic year a chapter of the sorority Sigma Sigma Sigma joined the campus along with the return of the fraternity Sigma Alpha Epsilon. Most recently, a colony of Alpha Gamma Delta was established in Spring 2018. Zeta Psi was suspended by its alumni board due to a slew of sexual assault allegations detailed on the Instagram page CWRU Survivors. Case's Interfraternity Council then voted to withdraw recognition of the chapter.

The fraternities are:

Beta Theta Pi
Delta Chi
Delta Sigma Phi
Delta Tau Delta
Delta Upsilon
Phi Delta Theta
Phi Gamma Delta
Phi Kappa Psi
Phi Kappa Tau

Phi Kappa Theta
Pi Kappa Phi
Sigma Alpha Epsilon
Sigma Chi
Sigma Nu
Theta Chi
Zeta Beta Tau

The sororities are:

Alpha Chi Omega
Alpha Gamma Delta
Alpha Phi
Delta Gamma
Kappa Alpha Theta

Phi Mu
Phi Sigma Rho
Pi Beta Phi
Sigma Psi
Sigma Sigma Sigma

Safety and security

Office of Emergency Management
The Office of Emergency Management prepares for various levels of emergencies on campus, such as chemical spills, severe weather, infectious diseases, and security threats. RAVE, a multi-platform emergency alerting system, is operated by Emergency Management for issuing emergency alerts and instructions for events on campus. The Office of Emergency Management also performs risk assessment to identify possible safety issues and aims to mitigate these issues. Additionally, CERT is managed through Emergency Management, enabling faculty and staff members to engage in emergency preparedness. The Office of Emergency Management works closely with other campus departments, such as Police and Security Services, University Health Services, and Environmental Health and Safety, as well as community resources including city, state, and federal emergency management agencies.

Police and security services
Case operates a police force of sworn officers as well as a security officers. Starting as security only, the university expanded the role of protective services to include sworn officers who have arrest power and carry firearms. Some officers have additional training, such as SWAT training. On top of routine duties such as fingerprinting, traffic control, and bicycle registration, police and security also conduct investigations, undercover operations, and community outreach. Police and Security operate a fleet of vehicles, including police cruisers, scooters, and Smart cars. Police and Security are dispatched by a 24/7 campus dispatch center, responsible for emergency call handling, alarm monitoring, and video surveillance. Additionally, the dispatch center can send RAVE notifications and manages CWRU Shield, a mobile application allowing video, image, and text tips, safety checks, and viewing emergency procedures. CWRU Police also works closely with RTA transit police, University Circle Police, Cleveland Police, East Cleveland Police, Cleveland Heights Police, University Hospitals Police Department, and other surrounding emergency services. Police and Security, with conjunction with the Emergency Management Office, conduct tabletop drills and full-scale exercises involving surrounding emergency services.

Emergency Medical Services
Case Western Reserve University Emergency Medical Services (CWRU EMS) is a student-run all volunteer ambulance service and a National Collegiate Emergency Medical Services Foundation member. Covering University Circle, CWRU EMS provides free basic life support level treatment and transport to local hospitals. Crews receive medical direction from University Hospitals. CWRU EMS is under operational oversight by the Department of Public Safety.

Traditions

Starting in 1910, the Hudson Relay is an annual relay race event remembering and honoring the university relocation from Hudson, Ohio to Cleveland. Conceived by then-student, Monroe Curtis, the relay race was run from the old college in Hudson, Ohio to the new university in University Circle. Since the mid-1980s, the race has been run entirely in the University Circle area. It is held weekend before spring semester finals. Competing running teams are divided by graduating class. If a class wins the relay all four years, tradition dictates a reward of a champagne and steak dinner with the president of the university be awarded. Only six classes have won all four years—1982, 1990, 1994, 2006, 2011, and 2017. The winning classes of each year is carved on an original boulder located behind Adelbert Hall.

Springfest is a day-long concert and student group festival that occurs later in the same day as Hudson Relays. The Springfest Planning Committee brings in several bands and a beer garden, student groups set up booths to entertain the student body, and various inflatable carnival-style attractions are brought in to add to the festive atmosphere. Occasionally, due to adverse weather conditions, the festival must be moved indoors, usually to Thwing Center or Adelbert Gym.

Halloween at the Farm is a tradition established in the fall of 2002. Halloween at the Farm takes place at the Squire Valleevue Farm in Hunting Valley, Ohio. Students, their families, and faculty are invited to enjoy games, a bonfire, an open-air concert and hay rides. Organized by the members of the Class Officer Collective, HATF is one of the biggest events of the year. In the fall of 2009 the event was moved to the main campus and renamed "Halloween at Home".

Since 1976, the Film Society of Case Western Reserve University has held a science fiction marathon. The film festival, the oldest of its type, boasts more than 34 hours of non-stop movies, cartoons, trailers, and shorts spanning many decades and subgenres, using both film and digital projection. The Film Society, which is student-run and open to the public, also shows movies on Friday and Saturday evenings throughout the school year.

Athletics

Case Western Reserve competes in 19 varsity sports—10 men's sports and 9 women's sports. All 19 varsity teams wear a commemorative patch on their uniforms honoring Case alumnus, M. Frank Rudy, inventor of the Nike air-sole. The Spartans' primary athletic rival is the Carnegie Mellon Tartans. DiSanto Field is home to the football, men's soccer, women's soccer, and track and field teams.

Case Western Reserve is a founding and current member of the University Athletic Association (UAA). The conference participates in the National Collegiate Athletic Association's (NCAA) Division III. Case Institute of Technology and Western Reserve University were also founding members of the Presidents' Athletic Conference (PAC) in 1958. When the athletic departments of the two universities merged in 1971 they dominated the (PAC) for several years. The university remained a member of the PAC until 1983. In the fall of 1984 the university joined the North Coast Athletic Conference (NCAC), a pioneer in gender equality in sports, as a charter member. The 1998–99 school year marked the final season in which the Spartans were members of the NCAC. As the university had held joint conference membership affiliation with the UAA and the NCAC for over a decade. In 2014, the football team began competing as an associate member of the PAC, as only four out of the eight UAA member institutions sponsored football. The university offers ten men's sports and nine women's sports.

Case Western Reserve has a long and stories cross country program.  The team won the conference every year for twelve straight years from 1967 to 1978 led by Coach Bill Sudeck, continued to win conference titles in 1985, 1986, 1988, 1992, 1993, and 1994.  The Case Western Reserve's women's cross country team finished the 2006 season with a UAA Championship and a bid to the NCAA Championship. The Lady Spartans finished 10th in the nation. The women's team went on to finish even higher at nationals in 2007, earning a sixth-place finish at the NCAA DIII national championship. Both the men's and women's Cross Country teams qualified for and competed in the NCAA DIII national championships in 2008, with the women's team coming away with two All-Americans and a 16th-place finish. In 2009, they had two All-Americans and finished 15th. In 2010, the lady Spartans finished 19th, with one all-American. From 2006 to 2010 the women's cross country team earned 8 individual All-American Titles, including current professional marathoner Esther Erb.

The Case Western Reserve football team reemerged in the mid-2000s under the direction of Head Coach Greg Debeljak. The 2007 team finished undefeated earning the school's first playoff appearance and first playoff victory, winning against the Widener Pride. The undefeated seasons continued in both 2008 and 2009, earning more UAA titles and NCAA Division III playoff appearances, helping set up an all-time school record of a 38-game regular season win streak. In 2017, the Spartans again went undefeated and advanced to the NCAA Division III playoffs, defeating the Illinois Wesleyan Titans in the first round, before being eliminated in the second round by the Mount Union Purple Raiders, the eventual NCAA Division III national champion. In total, the team has won eight UAA football championships–1988, 1996, 2007, 2008, 2009, 2011, 2016, and 2017. In 2014, the football team began competing as an associate member of the Presidents' Athletic Conference, winning the conference in 2017. All other sports continue to compete in the University Athletic Association. In 2019, the Spartans finished 9–2, winning an outright PAC title, and earning an automatic bid to the Division III playoffs, where they were defeated in the first round.

The Spartan men's tennis team has been ranked in the Division III for numerous years led by Coach Todd Wojtkowski. Beginning in 2013, the team advanced in the NCAA tournament. In 2014, two CWRU tennis players, Eric Klawitter and Christopher Krimbill, won the NCAA men's doubles title.  In 2016, the team made the NCAA tournament again.  The break through year was in 2021, when the Spartan men's tennis team advanced all the way to the finals of the NCAA Division III championship before losing to Emory 5–2. The 2021 team finished with an overall 14–3 record, with two of those losses coming against non-Division III competition.  The 2022 team finished national runner-up losing to Chicago 5–2, finishing the season 25–5, with four of those losses coming against non-Division III competition.  Also in 2022, James Hopper and Jonathan Powell won the NCAA men's doubles national title. The team won the 2022 ITA Division III Men's National Team Indoor Championship.

In 2018, the Case Western Reserve men's soccer team made their deepest NCAA run ever, advancing to the NCAA Division III "Elite Eight" before falling in the quarterfinals to the Calvin Knights, 3–1. The 2018 team finished the season with a record of 16–2–2.  The Case Western Reserve men's soccer team finished their 2006 season with a 17–2–2 record and a UAA championship. The team reached the Sweet 16 in their first-ever NCAA Division III tournament appearance and concluded the season ranked 12th in the nation.

The CWRU Spartan men's basketball team received their first bid to the NCAA Division III tournament in 2022 following an 18–6 regular season.  The Spartans defeated Dubuque College in the first round 91–87 in overtime, and then upset the top seeded and defending national champion Wisconsin-Oshkosh in Round Two 77–74.  The Spartans fell to Mary Hardin-Baylor in the Sweet 16 89–84 in overtime.

In recent years, the Case Western Reserve baseball team has made appearances in the NCAA post-season and won several UAA titles.  UAA titles have been won in 2013, 2014, 2018, and 2022.  In  2018, the team advanced to the third round of the NCAA tournament. In 2014, the Spartans advanced to the NCAA Mid-East Regional Final before losing to Salisbury State 3–2. The 2014 team set a school record for victories in a season with 34, and also won a UAA title. In 2011, Spartan third baseman Chad Mullins was named the D3Baseball.com Player of the Year after hitting .437 with eight home runs and 71 RBIs. Mullins also ranked in the Division III national top ten in hits, runs scored, and total bases.

CWRU has produced eight individual Division III national champions in Indoor and Outdoor Track and Field.  Mostly recently, Cassandra Laios won the national title for hammer throw in 2019.

The Case Western Reserve Ultimate Frisbee Team, although a club sport, competes against Division I teams around the country. Established in 1995, the Fighting Gobies have been successful, with the men's team taking home first place in the Ohio Valley Regional Tournament.

CWRU wrestlers have won four individual Division III national titles.

In 2022, the CWRU women's soccer team advanced to the NCAA finals for the first time before falling in the championship game to Johns Hopkins University.

Notable people

Notable alumni include John Charles Cutler, former surgeon general who violated human rights and led to deaths in the Tuskegee Syphilis Study, Terre Haute prison experiments, and the syphilis experiments in Guatemala; Anthony Russo and Joe Russo, Hollywood movie directors, Paul Buchheit, creator and lead developer of Gmail; Craig Newmark, billionaire founder of Craigslist; Peter Tippett, developer of the anti-virus software Vaccine, which Symantec purchased and turned into the popular Norton AntiVirus; Francis E. Sweeney the main suspect from the Cleveland Torso Murders also was a Case Alumnus.

Founders of Fortune 500 companies include Herbert Henry Dow, founder of Dow Chemical, Art Parker, founder of Parker Hannifin, and Edward Williams, co-founder of Sherwin-Williams.

Other notable alumni include Larry Hurtado, New Testament scholar; Harvey Hilbert, a zen master, psychologist and expert on post-Vietnam stress syndrome; Peter Sterling, neuroscientist and co-founder of the concept of allostasis; Ogiame Atuwatse III, Tsola Emiko the 21st Olu of Warri – a historic monarch of the Itsekiri people in Nigeria's Delta region, and Donald Knuth, a leading expert on computer algorithms and creator of the TeX typesetting system.

Nobel laureates

See also
 Association of Independent Technological Universities

Notes

References

Further reading

External links
 
 
 Case Western Reserve Athletics website

 
1826 establishments in Ohio
Educational institutions established in 1826
Technological universities in the United States
Universities and colleges in Cleveland
University Circle
Universities and colleges formed by merger in the United States
Private universities and colleges in Ohio
Western Reserve, Ohio
Universities and colleges accredited by the Higher Learning Commission